Il Guarany (The Guarany) is an opera ballo composed by Antônio Carlos Gomes, based on the novel O Guarani by José de Alencar. The work is notable as the first Brazilian opera to gain acclaim outside Brazil. Maria Alice Volpe has analysed the historical subtext of the indianism movement behind Il Guarany.

The operatic version of the story takes place near Rio de Janeiro in 1560, and the plot centers around an interracial love story between Pery, a Guarani indian prince, and Cecilia, the daughter of a Portuguese nobleman. The work emphasizes the Romanticized concept of the "noble savage" in an exotic Brazilian tropical setting as well as the concept of racial miscegenation, which had been a significant part of Brazilian life since the country's inception. In the Overture to the opera, Gomes creates a Romantic Indianist atmosphere over an Italian orchestral backdrop as he introduces intimate lyrical passages in the winds and strings contrasted by tempestuous dramatic moments that utilize the full dynamic range of the orchestra.

Performance history

The world premiere took place at La Scala, Milan, on 19 March 1870 and was a tremendous success, which resulted in immediate international fame for Gomes and numerous performances of the work in opera theaters throughout Europe. Among the productions, it was performed at the Zagreb theater in 1883 and 1886. The first Brazilian performance was in Rio de Janeiro on 2 December 1870, at the Theatro D. Pedro II. More recently, in 1996, Il Guarany was mounted by the Washington National Opera with Plácido Domingo in the role of Pery.

The duet "Sento una forza indomita" for tenor and soprano was in the recorded repertoire of Francesco Marconi with Bice Mililotti, 1908, and of Enrico Caruso with Emmy Destinn, 1914.

Roles

References
Notes

Sources
Bennett, John R., Voices of the Past, Volume 2 – A Catalogue of Vocal Recordings from The Italian Catalogues of the Gramophone Company (Italy) 1899–1909; The Gramophone Company Limited 1909; Compagnia Italiana Del Grammofono 1909–1912; Società Nazionale Del Grammofono 1912–1925. Lingfield, UK: The Oakwood Press, 1957
 Phillips-Matz, Mary Jane. Washington National Opera 1956–2006. Washington, D.C.: Washington National Opera, 2006. .

Further reading
Béhague, Gerard, "Il Guarany", The New Grove Dictionary of Opera'', (ed.) Stanley Sadie. London, 1992

External links 

Brazilian patriotic songs
Operas by Carlos Gomes
Italian-language operas
Operas
1870 operas
Opera world premieres at La Scala
Operas based on novels
Operas set in Brazil